Kurganinsk is a town and the administrative center of Kurganinsky District of Krasnodar Krai, Russia, located on the right bank of the Bolshaya Laba River  east of Krasnodar, the administrative center of the krai. Population: 48,194 people (2020),

History
It was founded in 1855 as the stanitsa of Kurgannaya by the Cossacks. It was renamed and granted town status in 1961.

Administrative and municipal status
Within the framework of administrative divisions, Kurganinsk serves as the administrative center of Kurganinsky District. As an administrative division, it is, together with two rural localities, incorporated within Kurganinsky District as the Town of Kurganinsk. As a municipal division, the Town of Kurganinsk is incorporated within Kurganinsky Municipal District as Kurganinskoye Urban Settlement.

References

Notes

Sources

Cities and towns in Krasnodar Krai
1855 establishments in the Russian Empire